Gerrid Doaks (born June 9, 1998) is an American football running back for the Houston Texans of the National Football League (NFL). He played college football at Cincinnati.

College career
Doaks played at the University of Cincinnati from 2017 to 2020. He was the starter for the Bearcats for his senior year in 2020. He would rush for 673 yards and had 14 total receptions for 202 yards over the 9 game, COVID-19 shortened season. His senior performance earned him first-team all-AAC honors.

Statistics

Professional career

Miami Dolphins
Doaks was drafted by the Miami Dolphins in the seventh round, 244th overall, of the 2021 NFL Draft. He signed his four-year rookie contract on May 13, 2021. Doaks was cut by the Dolphins on August 31 during final roster cuts and re-signed with the practice squad the next day. He signed a reserve/future contract with the Dolphins on January 14, 2022.

On August 29, 2022, Doaks was waived by the Dolphins.

Houston Texans
On September 7, 2022, Doaks was signed to the Houston Texans practice squad. He was released on November 16. He was re-signed on December 13. He signed a reserve/future contract on January 10, 2023.

References

External links
Houston Texans bio
Cincinnati Bearcats bio

1998 births
Living people
Players of American football from Indianapolis
American football running backs
Cincinnati Bearcats football players
Miami Dolphins players
Houston Texans players